Rolf Monsen (January 8, 1899 – April 28, 1987) was an American Olympic skier.

Rolf Monsen was born in Oslo, Norway. He competed in ski jumping, cross-country skiing, and Nordic combined. He was a member of three U.S. Olympic teams, 1928, 1932 and 1936. His best Olympic result was at the 1928 Winter Olympics in St. Moritz, where he placed sixth in ski jumping. Although unable to compete due to an injury, he was chosen to be the U.S. Team flag bearer at the 1936 Olympic Games.

During World War II, he worked with the United States Department of Defense to help train Ski Troops at the 10th Mountain Division. He later helped to promote skiing as at the Sugarbush Resort in Warren, Vermont.  He was elected to the National Ski Hall of Fame in 1964.

References

Related Reading
Baumgardner, Randy W. (1998) 10th Mountain Division(Turner Publishing Company) 
Feuer, A.B. (2006) Packs On!: Memoirs of the 10th Mountain Division in World War II (Stackpole Books)  
Pushies, Fred (2008)  10th Mountain Division Zenith Press) 
Shelton, Peter (2003)  Climb to Conquer: The Untold Story of WWII's 10th Mountain Division Ski Troops (Scribner) 

1899 births
1987 deaths
Norwegian emigrants to the United States
American male ski jumpers
American male cross-country skiers
American male Nordic combined skiers
Olympic ski jumpers of the United States
Olympic cross-country skiers of the United States
Olympic Nordic combined skiers of the United States
Ski jumpers at the 1928 Winter Olympics
Cross-country skiers at the 1928 Winter Olympics
Nordic combined skiers at the 1928 Winter Olympics
Cross-country skiers at the 1932 Winter Olympics
Nordic combined skiers at the 1932 Winter Olympics